is a Japanese jidaigeki or period drama that was broadcast in prime-time in 1977 to 1978. It is based on Eiji Yoshikawa's novel Naruto Hichō. The lead star is Masakazu Tamura. Norizuki is an Oniwaban of Tokugawa Shogunate. He goes to Awa Province to investigate a conspiracy in the Tokushima Han. There was a remake broadcast in 2018.

Cast
 Masakazu Tamura as Norizuki Gennojō
 Kyoko Mitsubayashi as Otsuna
 Mieko Harada as Chie
 Kō Nishimura as Yoami
 Hideo Takamatsu as Tendō Ikkaku
 Takashi Yamaguchi as Hiraga Gennai 
 Asami Kobayashi as Oyone
 Takeshi Kusaka as Zeami
 Reo Morimoto as Mankichi
 Shinjirō Ehara Magobei
 Ichirō Arishima as Monji no Tora
 Takuzō Kakuno 
 Kōjirō Kusanagi as Togashi
 Seiji Matsuyama as Hayashi Keinosuke

References

1978 Japanese television series debuts
1970s drama television series
Jidaigeki television series